Cecil Ash was a member of the Arizona House of Representatives, representing Arizona's 18th District from January 2009 until January 2013.

References

Republican Party members of the Arizona House of Representatives
1948 births
Living people